Vomiting agents are chemical weapon agents causing vomiting. Prolonged exposure can be lethal. They were used for the first time during WWI.

Examples
Adamsite
Chloropicrin
Diphenylchlorarsine
Diphenylcyanoarsine
Diphenylamincyanoarsine

References

Vomiting agents
Chemical weapons
Chemical warfare
Chemical weapons demilitarization
Aftermath of war